Stealing Images is a Canadian short drama film, directed by Alan Zweig and released in 1989. The film centres on a film director who is exploring the city for inspiration.

The film premiered at the 1989 Toronto International Film Festival, where it won the award for Best Canadian Short Film.

References

External links

1989 films
1989 short films
Canadian drama short films
Films directed by Alan Zweig
1980s English-language films
1980s Canadian films